The Boy Friend is a lost 1926 American romantic comedy film directed by Monta Bell. Based on the play The Book of Charm by John Alexander Kirkpatrick, the film starred Marceline Day and John Harron. This film also marked the film debut of character actress Elizabeth Patterson.

Plot
Comedy about a small-town girl unhappy with her family, and a boy trying to please her by throwing a big party.

Cast
 Marceline Day – Ida May Harper
 John Harron – Joe Pond
 George K. Arthur – Book Agent
 Ward Crane – Lester White
 Gertrude Astor – Mrs. White
 Otto Hoffman – Mr. Harper
 Maidel Turner – Mrs. Wilson
 Gwen Lee – Pettie Wilson
 Elizabeth Patterson – Mrs. Harper

See also
Gertrude Astor filmography
The Boy Friend (1971 film)

References

External links

The Boy Friend at SilentEra
The Boy Friend coming attraction lantern slide

1926 films
1926 romantic comedy films
American romantic comedy films
American silent feature films
American black-and-white films
American films based on plays
Films directed by Monta Bell
Lost American films
Metro-Goldwyn-Mayer films
1926 lost films
Lost romantic comedy films
1920s American films
Silent romantic comedy films
Silent American comedy films
1920s English-language films